Siluvai Michael Rayappan (born 19 March 1963) is an Indian politician and former Member of the Tamil Nadu Legislative Assembly from the Radhapuram constituency. He represented the Desiya Murpokku Dravida Kazhagam party. He is also a film producer and has produced such films like Nadodigal, Pattathu Yaanai, Eetti, and Miruthan under Global Infotainment's banner.

Career
After producing the commercially successful films Nadodigal (2009), Thenmerku Paruvakaatru (2010), Goripalayam (2010), Pattathu Yaanai (2013), and Eetti (2015), Rayappan produced Anbanavan Asaradhavan Adangadhavan (2017), a disaster at the box-office. Several months after the film's release, Rayappan criticised the unruly behaviour of film's lead actor Silambarasan for disrupting the film's shoot.

Filmography

References

Living people
Members of the Tamil Nadu Legislative Assembly
Tamil film producers
Desiya Murpokku Dravida Kazhagam politicians
1963 births
People from Tirunelveli district
Film producers from Tamil Nadu